George's Marvellous Medicine (known as George's Marvelous Medicine in the US) is a book written by Roald Dahl and illustrated by Quentin Blake. First published by Jonathan Cape in 1981, it features George Kranky, an eight-year-old boy who concocts his own miracle elixir to replace his tyrannical grandmother's regular prescription medicine.

Being a medical expert was one of what Dahl called his "dreams of glory": he had enormous respect for doctors and particularly those who pioneered new treatments. He dedicated the book to "doctors everywhere". An audio reading of it was released with Richard E. Grant narrating. In 2003, it was listed at number 134 on the BBC's The Big Read poll.

Plot
While eight-year-old George Kranky's parents are out grocery shopping, his elderly maternal grandmother bosses him around and bullies him. She intimidates him by saying that she likes to eat insects and he wonders briefly if she's a witch. To punish her for her regular abuse, he decides to make a magic medicine to replace her old prescription one. He collects a variety of ingredients from around the family farm including deodorant and shampoo from the bathroom, floor polish from the laundry room, horseradish sauce and gin from the kitchen, animal medicines, engine oil and anti-freeze from the garage, and brown paint to mimic the colour of the original medicine.

After cooking the ingredients in the kitchen, George gives it as medicine to his grandmother, who grows as tall as the house, bursting through the roof. When she doesn't believe it was him who made her do so, he proves it to her by feeding the medicine to one of his father's chickens, which grows ten times its original size. As they return home, Mr. and Mrs. Kranky can't believe their eyes when they see the giant chicken and grandmother. Mr. Kranky grows very excited at the thought of rearing giant animals. He has George feed the medicine to the rest of the farm's animals, causing them to become giants as well. However, his grandmother begins complaining about being ignored and stuck in the house, so Mr. Kranky hires a crane to remove her from it. Her extreme height has her sleeping in the barn for the next few nights.

The following morning, Mr. Kranky is still excited about George's medicine and announces that he and George shall make gallons of it to sell to farmers around the world, which would make his family rich. George attempts to recreate it but is unable to remember all the ingredients. The second version makes a chicken's legs grow extremely long, and the third elongates another one's neck to bizarre proportions. The fourth has the opposite effect of the first and makes animals shrink. George's grandmother, now even more angry because she has to sleep in the barn, storms over and starts complaining loudly that she's once again sick of being ignored. She sees the cup of medicine in George's hand and erroneously mistakes it for tea. Much to his and Mrs. Kranky's horror, and Mr. Kranky's delight, she drinks the entire cup and shrinks so much that she vanishes completely. At first, Mrs. Kranky is shocked, confused, and distraught about her mother's sudden and very strange disappearance, but soon accepts that she was becoming a nuisance anyway. In the last page, George is left to think about the implications of his actions, feeling as though they had granted him access to the edge of a magic world.

Safety concerns
Though it was a popular book for reading to children in primary school, great care was taken by teachers to warn children to not try and recreate the medicine at home due to the hazardous nature of some of its ingredients. There is a disclaimer warning before the story stating "Warning to Readers: Do not try to make George's Marvellous Medicine yourselves at home. It could be dangerous." In 2020, a team of British researchers performed a toxicological investigation into the potion and all 34 of its ingredients. They reported in the BMJ that if ingested, it would cause vomiting, kidney injury, convulsions, and other severe health problems, including "the most likely clinical outcome", death. "The overall outcome for Grandma would be fatal catastrophic physiological collapse," they wrote.

Ingredients
The original ingredients are as follows:

Toothpaste
Golden gloss hair shampoo
Superfoam shaving soap
Vitamin enriched face cream
Scarlet nail varnish 
Hair remover 
Dishworth's dandruff cure 
Brillident false teeth cleaner 
Nevermore ponging deodorant 
Liquid paraffin 
Helga's hairset 
Perfume: 'Flower of turnips' 
Pink plaster powder 
Lipsticks 
Superwhite washing powder 
Waxwell floor polish 
Flea powder for dogs 
Canary seed
Dark tan shoe polish
Curry powder
Mustard powder
'Extra hot' chilli sauce
Black peppercorns
Horseradish sauce
Gin
Fowl pest powder to mix with feed
Purple pills for hoarse horses
Thick yellowish liquid for cows
Sheep dip
Pig pills for swine sickness
Engine oil
Antifreeze
Grease
Dark brown gloss paint

In the cookbook Roald Dahl's Completely Revolting Recipes, collaborated on by Felicity Dahl and chefs Josie Fison and Lori-Ann Newman, George's medicine was adapted into "George's Marvellous Medicine Chicken Soup", the ingredients of which included chicken, onions, mushrooms, leeks, and tarragon.

Influence
Dahl was influenced by Lewis Carroll's Alice's Adventures in Wonderland, with the "Drink Me" episode inspiring a scene in George's Marvellous Medicine where the tyrannical grandmother drinks a potion concocted by George and is blown up to the size of a farmhouse.

Television version
Rik Mayall read the book for the BBC's Jackanory children's programme in 1986, in a widely acclaimed performance.

References

1981 British novels
British children's novels
British fantasy novels
Children's books by Roald Dahl
Fiction about size change
Jonathan Cape books
1981 children's books
Children's novels